WIHE-LP is a Variety formatted broadcast radio station licensed to and serving Liberty, Kentucky.  WIHE-LP is owned and operated by Wesley Communications, LLC.

References

External links
 101.3 FM Online
 

2015 establishments in Kentucky
Variety radio stations in the United States
Radio stations established in 2015
IHE-LP
IHE-LP
Casey County, Kentucky